S.D.M.N. Vidya Mandir, Nilokheri (known as Rice Land) is a private school teaching students in kindergarten through twelfth grade from Nilokheri township of Karnal in Haryana, India. S.D.M.N. Vidya Mandir is one of two high schools in Nilokheri with high standards of education.

The school opened in 1989. In the 2007-08 academic year, the school enrolled over 2,500 students and employed 60 classroom teachers.

History
S.D.M.N. Vidya Mandir, Nilokheri was established in 1989 under a trust with the help from funds from rice-processing firm Rice Land. It had the name "Rice Land School" in early years and was later renamed to "SDMN Vidya Mandir School" but is still widely recognized by the unofficial name "Rice Land". It is administered by the school committee members.

Disciplines
The school provides education to children of all ages and interests.
 Kindergarten
 Senior Secondary
 High School
 Commerce
 Medical
 Non-Medical

1989 establishments in Haryana
Schools in Haryana
Nilokheri
Educational institutions established in 1989